Elliot Goldenthal (born May 2, 1954) is an American composer of contemporary classical music and film and theatrical scores. A student of Aaron Copland and John Corigliano, he is best known for his distinctive style and ability to blend various musical styles and techniques in original and inventive ways. He won the Academy Award for Best Original Score in 2002 for his score to the motion picture Frida, directed by his longtime partner Julie Taymor.

Early life and education
Goldenthal was born on May 2, 1954, the youngest son of a Jewish housepainter father and a Catholic seamstress mother in Brooklyn, New York City, where he was influenced from an early age by music from all cultures and genres. Both pairs of Goldenthal's grandparents emigrated to the United States from Bucharest and Iași, Romania. Goldenthal lived in a multi-cultural part of town, and this is reflected in his works. He attended John Dewey High School in Brooklyn where, at the age of 14, he had his very first ballet Variations on Early Glimpses performed; he continued to display his eclectic musical range, performing with rock bands in the seventies.

He then studied music full-time at the prestigious Manhattan School of Music, where he studied with composer John Corigliano (whom he greatly admired), to earn his Bachelor of Music degree (1977) and Master of Music degree (1979) in musical composition.

Career
Goldenthal has written works for concert hall, theater, dance and film. His work includes music for films such as Pet Sematary, Alien 3, Michael Collins, Batman Forever, Heat and the Academy Award-winning score for Julie Taymor's Frida, a movie in which Goldenthal had a small acting part as a "Newsreel Reporter". Incidentally he also had a small part in the stage show Juan Darièn as a "Circus Barker / Streetsinger".

The Tony Award-winning Juan Darién: A Carnival Mass (1988/'96) and The Green Bird (1999), based on a story by Carlo Gozzi, are two of the composer's theatre works. In 2006, Goldenthal completed his original three-act opera with Taymor entitled Grendel an adaptation of the John Gardner novel of the same name which told the story of Beowulf from the monster Grendel's point of view. It had its world premiere in early June 2006 at the Los Angeles Opera, the role of Grendel performed by Eric Owens, with an audience that included John Williams and Emmy Rossum; the opus was added to the Los Angeles Opera's permanent repertoire and earned Goldenthal a nomination in April 2007 for the Pulitzer Prize for Music. In 2008 Goldenthal reunited with Michael Mann to score 1930s gangster movie Public Enemies and in 2009 he scored another Julie Taymor Shakespeare adaptation, The Tempest. He cites Japanese composer Tōru Takemitsu as an influence and someone he styles his own career on; Goldenthal has said that the lines between traditional concert music and orchestral film score have become more blurred which is the way he thinks it should be. He has also collaborated four times with Irish director Neil Jordan, including on his films Interview with the Vampire and In Dreams.

Personal life
He lives in New York City "happily unmarried", as he once put it, with his partner Julie Taymor, whom he met in 1980 through a mutual acquaintance, who told him, "I know a person whose work is just as grotesque as yours". They have an office/apartment where they both live and work.

Style
Elliot Goldenthal has been called the "thinking man's composer" by film-music collectors and a generally more cerebral choice for film makers and lovers of film music. He is known for his experimentation, nuances and willingness to try unconventional techniques. He has scored films in almost every genre from horror to action to Shakespeare adaptations. He has not yet scored comedy, but he has composed comedic motifs for several films such as Demolition Man and the Batman series. His eclectic output has gained him a great deal of respect in the music and film communities and with fans. He is widely appreciated for his musical abilities and distinctive style, although some find his work to be too experimental or inaccessible. His action music is brutal and atonal. Sometimes, in underscore, he uses very fast French horn passages with bending tones and whining. Goldenthal has said that he doesn't "hear" atonal and tonal, rather, "I either hear melody or I hear sonority".

Goldenthal often works with a team he assembled after the soundtrack for Drugstore Cowboy: Teese Gohl as supervising producer, Robert Elhai as orchestrator, Joel Iwataki and Steve McLaughlin as sound engineers and Richard Martinez as electronic music producer. According to Martinez, "a lot of composers want to focus on writing their music, and that's what [his] team allows Elliot to do." At the website filmscoremonthly.com, a former classmate of Goldenthal's commented on an article on the Sphere score from 1998 which stated that when he and Elliot were both studying at the Manhattan School of Music in the '70s, Elliot was already experimenting with unusual techniques. Once, when studying trumpet, Elliot had asked him to "buzz into the wrong end of the mouthpiece and sing into it as well". He thought he was crazy but, looking back after a decade or so of Goldenthal's film and concert music, he "was just way ahead of the rest of us," he said.

List of works

Film and television works

Feature films

Television programs

Concert music works

Theatre works

Awards and nominations
 (2007) Pulitzer Prize for Music in Music Nomination for his acclaimed "Grendel" opera
 (2004) Emmy Awards Nomination, "Great Performances: Dance in America" – Outstanding Music Composition for a Miniseries, Movie or a Special (Dramatic Underscore)
 (2004) ASCAP Film and Television Music Awards Win, "S.W.A.T." – Top Box Office Film Score
 (2003) World Soundtrack Awards 2003 Win, "Frida" – Best Original Soundtrack of the Year
 (2003) World Soundtrack Awards 2003 Win, "Frida" – Soundtrack Composer of the Year
 (2003) World Soundtrack Awards 2003 Nomination, "Burn It Blue" from "Frida" – Best Original Song Written for a Film
 (2002) Academy Awards Win, "Frida" – Best Original Score
 (2002) Academy Awards Nomination, "Frida", "Burn It Blue" – Best Original Song
 (2002) Golden Globes Win, "Frida" – Best Original Score
 (2002) World Soundtrack Awards 2002 Nomination, "The Dream Within" from "Final Fantasy: The Sprits Within" – Best Original Song Written for a Film
 (1999) Chicago Film Critics Association awards Nomination, "The Butcher Boy" – Best Original Score
 (1998) ASCAP awards Win, "Batman & Robin" – Top Box Office Film Score
 (1998) Chicago Film Critics Awards Nomination, "The Butcher Boy" – Best Original Score
 (1998) Los Angeles Film Critics Association Awards 1998 Win, "The Butcher Boy" – Best Original Score
 (1997) Tony Awards Nomination, "Juan Darien: A Carnival Mass" (Broadway Production) – Best Original Musical Score
 (1997) ASCAP awards Win, "A Time to Kill" – Top Box Office Film Score
 (1997) Grammy Nomination, "Defile and Lament" from "A Time to Kill"
 (1996) Academy Awards Nomination, "Michael Collins" – Best Original Score
 (1996) Golden Globe Nomination, "Michael Collins" – Best Original Score
 (1996) ASCAP awards Win, "Batman Forever" – Top Box Office Film Score
 (1995) Grammy Nomination, "Batman Forever" – Best Instrumental Composition
 (1995) ASCAP awards Win, "Interview with the Vampire" – Top Box Office Film Score
 (1995) Golden Globe Nomination, "Interview with the Vampire" – Best Original Score
 (1994) Academy Awards Nomination, "Interview with the Vampire" – Best Original Score
 (1994) ASCAP awards Win, "Demolition Man" – Top Box Office Film Score
 (1990) Edinburgh Festival Critics Choice Award Win, "Juan Darien: A Carnival Mass" – Best Music
 (1990) American Academy of Arts and Letters Richard Rodgers Award Win, "Juan Darien: A Carnival Mass" – Best Music
 (1988) Obie Award Win''', "Juan Darien: A Carnival Mass''" (Original Production) – Best Music

Among others including the Arturo Toscanini Award, the New Music for Young Ensembles composition prize, the Stephen Sondheim Award in Music Theater and a New York Foundation for the Arts fellowship.

See also
 Avant-garde
 Modernism (music)

References

External links

 
 
 
 
 Elliot Goldenthal at Rate Your Music
 
 [ Elliot Goldenthal] at Allmusic
 "A Website for the Composer"
 Elliot Goldenthal at Moviemusicuk.us
 An Interview with both Taymor and Goldenthal by the New York Times
 An indepth interview from 2003

1954 births
20th-century classical composers
21st-century American composers
21st-century classical composers
American classical composers
American film score composers
American male classical composers
American musical theatre composers
American musical theatre lyricists
American opera composers
American people of Romanian-Jewish descent
Best Original Music Score Academy Award winners
Golden Globe Award-winning musicians
Broadway composers and lyricists
John Dewey High School alumni
Living people
American male film score composers
Male opera composers
Musicians from Brooklyn
Obie Award recipients
Pupils of Aaron Copland
20th-century American composers
Atlantic Records artists
Sony Classical Records artists
Warner Records artists
La-La Land Records artists